Morphosis Architects are an interdisciplinary architectural and design practice based in Los Angeles and New York City.

Morphosis may also refer to:

Biology
 Anamorphosis (biology)
 Epimorphosis
 Heteromorphosis
 Metamorphosis

Music
 Morphosis (Hate album), an album by Hate
 Morphosis (Max Lilja album), an album by Max Lilja
 Morphosis, an album by Ming Bridges
 Morphosis, an album by Boris Carloff
 "Morphosis", a song by Drottnar from Anamorphosis (EP)

Other uses
 Morphosis (wrestler) (born 1969), Mexican professional wrestler

See also
 Morphoses, a ballet production company
 MorphoSys, a German biopharmaceutical company